Ranko Zidarić (born 1 February 1965) is a Croatian actor and screenwriter.

Biography 
Born in Zagreb to a father Krešimir (1933–1998), who was also an actor, and a mother Danica "Seka" Zidarić (d. 2018), Ranko graduated at the Academy of Dramatic Art at the University of Zagreb in 1990.

He voiced Buzz Lightyear in the Croatian-language dub of the Toy Story franchise and Makunga in Madagascar: Escape 2 Africa.

In 2012, on behalf of the "Sova Zone" project, he starred, co-written and co-produced the sitcom Špica, with Gavella colleague Filip Šovagović.

Personal life
In 1994, Zidarić married Croatian film director Saša Broz, a granddaughter of the President of Yugoslavia Josip Broz Tito. They have a daughter Sara, and got divorced in 2000.

In 2007, Zidarić married his second wife Ivana Uhlik, with whom he has a daughter Zora.

Filmography

References

External links

1965 births
Living people
Croatian male actors
Croatian screenwriters